Storm Management  is a British model agency based in Chelsea, London.

Background
Storm was founded in 1987 by Sarah Doukas in London. Doukas discovered Kate Moss, Cara Delevingne, Behati Prinsloo, and Anya Taylor-Joy. In 2009, Doukas sold a controlling stake in the company to 19 Entertainment. Doukas and her brother Simon Chambers continue to run the business. Their sister was the actress Emma Chambers.

Fashion models and celebrities represented by Storm
* Bianca Balti
 Monica Bellucci
 Kate Bock
 Carla Bruni
 Michael Bublé
 Estelle Chen
 Alexa Chung
 Cindy Crawford
 Charlotte D'Alessio
 Cintia Dicker
 Natalie Dormer
 Anna Ewers
 Hero Fiennes-Tiffin
 Rose Hanbury
 Leonie Hanne
 Sui He
 Riley Keough
 Karolina Kurkova
 Chloe Lloyd
 Rebecca Leigh Longendyke
 Vanessa Moody
 Caroline Brasch Nielsen
 Felice Noordhoff
 Giselle Norman
 Tom Odell
 Oluchi Onweagba
 Anita Pallenberg
 Joey Paras
 Soo Joo Park
 Andreja Pejic
 Morgane Polanski
 Delphi Primrose
 Adesuwa Aighewi
 Behati Prinsloo
 Jasmine Sanders
 Josephine Skriver
 Mimi Slinger
 Carmen Solomons
 Lady Kitty Spencer
 Julia Stegner
 Fran Summers
 Fei Fei Sun
 Emma Watson
 Alek Wek
 Liu Wen
 Tami Williams
 Holly Willoughby
 Lady Amelia Windsor
 Lindsey Wixson
 Wizkid
 Maureen Wroblewitz
 Ayu Gani

See also 
 List of modeling agencies
 Simon Fuller

Further reading

References

External  links
 
 Storm Models in the Fashion Model Directory

Entertainment companies established in 1987
Modeling agencies